Gustaf Backaliden (born 15 September 1997) is a Swedish footballer who plays for Finnish club VPS.

Club career
On 31 January 2022, he signed a contract for 2022 season with VPS, with an option for 2023.

References

1997 births
Living people
Swedish footballers
Kvarnby IK players
IFK Malmö Fotboll players
IFK Mariehamn players
Seinäjoen Jalkapallokerho players
Vaasan Palloseura players
Veikkausliiga players
Association football midfielders
Footballers from Malmö
Swedish expatriate footballers
Expatriate footballers in Finland
Swedish expatriate sportspeople in Finland